"Back Stabbers" is a 1972 song by the O'Jays.  Released from the hit album of the same name, it spent one week at number 1 on the Hot Soul Singles chart. It was also successful on the pop chart, peaking at number 3 on the Billboard Hot 100 in October 1972.  The narrator in "Back Stabbers" warns men about their male "friends" who smile to their faces, but are secretly planning to steal their wives or girlfriends.  It was inspired by an earlier hit with a similar theme, the Undisputed Truth's "Smiling Faces Sometimes", the chorus of which is quoted at the end of this song. It was part of the soundtrack for the 1977 movie, Looking for Mr. Goodbar.

This was the O'Jays first release with Philadelphia International.

Chart performance

Weekly charts

Year-end charts

Stephen Cummings version  

In 1983 Australian singer-songwriter Stephen Cummings released Backstabbers in December 1983 through the Regular Records label as the third single from the album Senso. Cummings version peaked at number 40 on the Kent Music Report.

Track listing

Personnel 
 Arranged by (brass arrangements) – Greg Flood
 Joe Creighton - Bass, Additional vocals
 Mark Ferry - Bass
 Vince Jones - Cornet (solo)
 Martin Armiger - Drum programming (Drumulator), Guitar, Keyboards
 Peter Luscombe - Drums
 Andrew Pendlebury - Guitar
 Robert Goodge - Guitar
 Duncan Veal - Keyboards
 Jantra de Vilda - Keyboards
 Stephen Bigger - Keyboards
 Ricky Fataar -  Percussion
 Venetta Fields - Additional vocals
 Nick Smith - Additional vocals
 Linda Nutter - Additional vocals
 Nick Smith - Additional vocals
 Stephanie Sproul - Additional vocals

Charts

References

External links
 [ Song review] on AllMusic

1972 singles
The O'Jays songs
Philadelphia International Records singles
Songs written by Gene McFadden
Songs written by John Whitehead (singer)
Songs written by Leon Huff
1972 songs
Cashbox number-one singles
Stephen Cummings songs
1983 singles
1983 songs
Regular Records singles
Warner Music Group singles
Song recordings produced by Martin Armiger